Mariculture or marine farming is a specialized branch of aquaculture (which includes freshwater aquaculture) involving the cultivation of marine organisms for food and other animal products, in enclosed sections of the open ocean (offshore mariculture), fish farms built on littoral waters (inshore mariculture), or in artificial tanks, ponds or raceways which are filled with seawater (onshore mariculture). An example of the latter is the farming of marine fish, including finfish and shellfish like prawns, or oysters and seaweed in saltwater ponds. Non-food products produced by mariculture include: fish meal, nutrient agar, jewellery (e.g. cultured pearls), and cosmetics.

Methods

Algae

Shellfish
Similar to algae cultivation, shellfish can be farmed in multiple ways: on ropes, in bags or cages, or directly on (or within) the intertidal substrate. Shellfish mariculture does not require feed or fertilizer inputs, nor insecticides or antibiotics, making shellfish aquaculture (or 'mariculture') a self-supporting system. Shellfish can also be used in multi-species cultivation techniques, where shellfish can utilize waste generated by higher trophic level organisms.

Artificial reefs

After trials in 2012, a  commercial "sea ranch" was set up in Flinders Bay, Western Australia to raise abalone. The ranch is based on an artificial reef made up of 5000 separate concrete units called abitats (abalone habitats). The  abitats can host 400 abalone each. The reef is seeded with young abalone from an onshore hatchery.

The abalone feed on seaweed that has grown naturally on the habitats; with the ecosystem enrichment of the bay also resulting in growing numbers of dhufish, pink snapper, wrasse, Samson fish among other species.

Brad Adams, from the company, has emphasised the similarity to wild abalone and the difference from shore based aquaculture. "We're not aquaculture, we're ranching, because once they're in the water they look after themselves."

Sea ranching 
One of the methods of mariculture that is used widely throughout the industry is sea ranching. Sea ranching gained popularity within the industry around 1974. When looking at the effectiveness of this method of fish production, it needs to be set up within the right environment. When sea ranching is done within the right environment for the species, it can prove itself to be a profitable method to produce the crop if the right growth conditions are met. Many species have been studied through the use of sea ranching, which include salmon, cod, scallops, certain species of prawn, European lobsters, abalone and sea cucumbers. Species that are grown within the methods of sea ranching do not have any additional artificial feed requirements because they are living off of the naturally occurring nutrients within the body of water that the sea pen is set up. Typical practice involving the use of sea ranching and sea pens calls for the juveniles of the crop species to be planted on the bottom of the body of water within the pen, and as they grow and develop, they start to utilize more of the water column within their sea pen.

Open ocean
Raising marine organisms under controlled conditions in exposed, high-energy ocean environments beyond significant coastal influence, is a relatively new approach to mariculture. Some attention has been paid to how open ocean mariculture can combine with offshore energy installation systems, such as wind-farms, to enable a more effective use of ocean space. Open ocean aquaculture (OOA) uses cages, nets, or long-line arrays that are moored, towed or float freely. Research and commercial open ocean aquaculture facilities are in operation or under development in Panama, Australia, Chile, China, France, Ireland, Italy, Japan, Mexico, and Norway. , two commercial open ocean facilities were operating in U.S. waters, raising Threadfin near Hawaii and cobia near Puerto Rico. An operation targeting bigeye tuna recently received final approval. All U.S. commercial facilities are currently sited in waters under state or territorial jurisdiction. The largest deep water open ocean farm in the world is raising cobia 12 km off the northern coast of Panama in highly exposed sites.

There has been considerable discussion as to how mariculture of seaweeds can be conducted in the open ocean as a means to regenerate decimated fish populations by providing both habitat and the basis of a trophic pyramid for marine life. It has been proposed that natural seaweed ecosystems can be replicated in the open ocean by creating the conditions for their growth through artificial upwelling and through submerged tubing that provide substrate. Proponents and permaculture experts recognise that such approaches correspond to the core principles of permaculture and thereby constitute marine permaculture. The concept envisions using artificial upwelling and floating, submerged platforms as substrate to replicate natural seaweed ecosystems that provide habitat and the basis of a trophic pyramid for marine life. Following the principles of permaculture, seaweeds and fish from marine permaculture arrays can be sustainably harvested with the potential of also sequestering atmospheric carbon, should seaweeds be sunk below a depth of one kilometer. As of 2020, a number of successful trials have taken place in Hawaii, the Philippines, Puerto Rico and Tasmania. The idea has received substantial public attention, notably featuring as a key solution covered by Damon Gameau’s documentary 2040 and in the book Drawdown: The Most Comprehensive Plan Ever Proposed to Reverse Global Warming edited by Paul Hawken.

Enhanced stocking
Enhanced Stocking (also known as sea ranching) is a Japanese principle based on operant conditioning and the migratory nature of certain species. The fishermen raise hatchlings in a closely knitted net in a harbor, sounding an underwater horn before each feeding. When the fish are old enough they are freed from the net to mature in the open sea. During spawning season, about 80% of these fish return to their birthplace. The fishermen sound the horn and then net those fish that respond.

Seawater ponds
In seawater pond mariculture, fish are raised in ponds which receive water from the sea. This has the benefit that the nutrition (e.g. microorganisms) present in the seawater can be used. This is a great advantage over traditional fish farms (e.g. sweet water farms) for which the farmers buy feed (which is expensive). Other advantages are that water purification plants may be planted in the ponds to eliminate the buildup of nitrogen, from fecal and other contamination. Also, the ponds can be left unprotected from natural predators, providing another kind of filtering.

Environmental effects
Mariculture has rapidly expanded over the last two decades due to new technology, improvements in formulated feeds, greater biological understanding of farmed species, increased water quality within closed farm systems, greater demand for seafood products, site expansion and government interest. As a consequence, mariculture has been subject to some controversy regarding its social and environmental impacts. Commonly identified environmental impacts from marine farms are:

 Wastes from cage cultures;
 Farm escapees and invasives;
 Genetic pollution and disease and parasite transfer;
 Habitat modification.

As with most farming practices, the degree of environmental impact depends on the size of the farm, the cultured species, stock density, type of feed, hydrography of the site, and husbandry methods. The adjacent diagram connects these causes and effects.

Wastes from cage cultures
Mariculture of finfish can require a significant amount of fishmeal or other high protein food sources. Originally, a lot of fishmeal went to waste due to inefficient feeding regimes and poor digestibility of formulated feeds which resulted in poor feed conversion ratios.

In cage culture, several different methods are used for feeding farmed fish – from simple hand feeding to sophisticated computer-controlled systems with automated food dispensers coupled with in situ uptake sensors that detect consumption rates. In coastal fish farms, overfeeding primarily leads to increased disposition of detritus on the seafloor (potentially smothering seafloor dwelling invertebrates and altering the physical environment), while in hatcheries and land-based farms, excess food goes to waste and can potentially impact the surrounding catchment and local coastal environment. This impact is usually highly local, and depends significantly on the settling velocity of waste feed and the current velocity (which varies both spatially and temporally) and depth.

Farm escapees and invasives
The impact of escapees from aquaculture operations depends on whether or not there are wild conspecifics or close relatives in the receiving environment, and whether or not the escapee is reproductively capable. Several different mitigation/prevention strategies are currently employed, from the development of infertile triploids to land-based farms which are completely isolated from any marine environment. Escapees can adversely impact local ecosystems through hybridization and loss of genetic diversity in native stocks, increase negative interactions within an ecosystem (such as predation and competition), disease transmission and habitat changes (from trophic cascades and ecosystem shifts to varying sediment regimes and thus turbidity).

The accidental introduction of invasive species is also of concern. Aquaculture is one of the main vectors for invasives following accidental releases of farmed stocks into the wild. One example is the Siberian sturgeon (Acipenser baerii) which accidentally escaped from a fish farm into the Gironde Estuary (Southwest France) following a severe storm in December 1999 (5,000 individual fish escaped into the estuary which had never hosted this species before). Molluscan farming is another example whereby species can be introduced to new environments by ‘hitchhiking’ on farmed molluscs. Also, farmed molluscs themselves can become dominate predators and/or competitors, as well as potentially spread pathogens and parasites.

Genetic pollution, disease, and parasite transfer
One of the primary concerns with mariculture is the potential for disease and parasite transfer. Farmed stocks are often selectively bred to increase disease and parasite resistance, as well as improving growth rates and quality of products. As a consequence, the genetic diversity within reared stocks decreases with every generation – meaning they can potentially reduce the genetic diversity within wild populations if they escape into those wild populations. Such genetic pollution from escaped aquaculture stock can reduce the wild population's ability to adjust to the changing natural environment. Species grown by mariculture can also harbour diseases and parasites (e.g., lice) which can be introduced to wild populations upon their escape. An example of this is the parasitic sea lice on wild and farmed Atlantic salmon in Canada. Also, non-indigenous species which are farmed may have resistance to, or carry, particular diseases (which they picked up in their native habitats) which could be spread through wild populations if they escape into those wild populations. Such ‘new’ diseases would be devastating for those wild populations because they would have no immunity to them.

Habitat modification
With the exception of benthic habitats directly beneath marine farms, most mariculture causes minimal destruction to habitats. However, the destruction of mangrove forests from the farming of shrimps is of concern. Globally, shrimp farming activity is a small contributor to the destruction of mangrove forests; however, locally it can be devastating. Mangrove forests provide rich matrices which support a great deal of biodiversity – predominately juvenile fish and crustaceans. Furthermore, they act as buffering systems whereby they reduce coastal erosion, and improve water quality for in situ animals by processing material and ‘filtering’ sediments.

Others
In addition, nitrogen and phosphorus compounds from food and waste may lead to blooms of phytoplankton, whose subsequent degradation can drastically reduce oxygen levels. If the algae are toxic, fish are killed and shellfish contaminated.<ref>
UNEP, World Fisheries Trust. (2002).  [http://www.cbd.int/doc/meetings/mar/temctre-01/official/temctre-01-02-en.pdf THE EFFECTS OF MARICULTURE ON BIODIVERSITY"]</ref> These algal blooms are sometimes referred to as harmful algal blooms, which are caused by a high influx of nutrients, such as nitrogen and phosphorus, into the water due to run-off from land based human operations. 

Over the course of rearing various species, the sediment on bottom of the specific body of water becomes highly metallic with influx of copper, zinc and lead that is being introduced to the area. This influx of these heavy metals is likely due to the buildup of fish waste, uneaten fish feed, and the paint that comes off the boats and floats that are used in the mariculture operations.

Sustainability
Mariculture development may be sustained by basic and applied research and development in major fields such as nutrition, genetics, system management, product handling, and socioeconomics. One approach uses closed systems that have no direct interaction with the local environment.
However, investment and operational cost are currently significantly higher than with open cages, limiting closed systems to their current role as hatcheries.

Benefits
Sustainable mariculture promises economic and environmental benefits. Economies of scale imply that ranching can produce fish at lower cost than industrial fishing, leading to better human diets and the gradual elimination of unsustainable fisheries. Fish grown by mariculture are also perceived to be of higher quality than fish raised in ponds or tanks, and offer more diverse choice of species. Consistent supply and quality control has enabled integration in food market channels.

Species farmed

Fish

 European sea bass
 Bigeye tuna
 Cobia
 Grouper
 Snapper
 Pompano
 Salmon
 Pearlspot
 Mullet
 Pomfret
 Barramundi

Shellfish/Crustaceans

 Abalone
 Oysters
 Prawn
 Mussels

Plants
 Seaweeds

Scientific literature
Scientific literature on mariculture can be found in the following journals:

 Applied and Environmental Microbiology Aquaculture Aquaculture Research Journal of Marine Science Marine Resource Economics Ocean Shoreline Management Journal of Applied Phycology Journal of Experimental Marine Biology and Ecology Journal of Phycology Journal of Shellfish Research Reviews in Fish Biology and Fisheries Reviews in Fisheries ScienceSee also

 Aquaculture
 Fish farming
 Hydroponics
 Algaculture
 Oyster farming
 Aquaponics
 Copper alloys in aquaculture
 Integrated Multi-Trophic Aquaculture
 Saltwater aquaponics
 Seaweed farming

References

External links
 Longline Environment
 Worldfishcenter -provides info on cultivating certain marine organisms
 Web based aquaculture simulations for shellfish in estuaries and coastal systems: Simulation modelling for mussels, oysters and clams.
 Mariculture guidelines and best practices: A coastal management perspective on mariculture development by the University of Rhode Island Coastal Resources Center.
 Mariculture Marine Science''. Retrieved 14 January 2010.
 Flotilla Online – Apocalyptic fiction novel about a mariculture enterprise in the near-future and hub for mariculture topics.

Aquaculture